Stephen Morris (born January 4, 1946) is a former Republican member of the Kansas Senate, representing the 39th district from 1993 to 2013.  He was Senate president from 2005-2013.  From 1977 to 1993, he served as the vice-president, then president of the Kansas Unified School District 210, Board of Education. He is a farmer from Hugoton.

Committee assignments
Morris served on these legislative committees:
 Interstate Cooperation (chair)
 Joint Committee on Legislative Coordinating Council (chair)
 Organization, Calendar and Rules (chair)
 Joint Committee on Pensions, Investments and Benefits (vice-chair)
 Agriculture
 Federal and State Affairs
 Natural Resources

Major donors
Some of the top contributors to Morris's 2008 campaign, according to the National Institute on Money in State Politics:
 Kansas for Quality Mental Health Services, Astrazeneca, Kansas Association of Realtors, Westlink Communications, Heavy Constructors Association. Financial, insurance and real estate companies were his largest donor group.

Elections
In 1992, Morris defeated incumbent Democrat Leroy Hayden, by 15,178 to 7,456 votes.
Seven of eight moderate state senate Republicans, including Morris, targeted by the Koch brothers, were defeated in the 2012 Republican primary, giving incumbent Governor Sam Brownback the margin he needed to effectively restructure state taxation, exempting "S" status filers such as Koch Industries from income taxes.  Morris lost to Larry Powell by a 5,106-4,737 margin in the primary on Aug. 7, 2012. In 2014, Morris, as a member of Republicans for Kansas Values, supported Democratic State Senator Paul Davis for governor, over Brownback.

References

External links
Senator Steve Morris - President of the Senate at the Kansas Legislature (archive)
 
The Great Kansas Republican Purge of 2012, David Weigel, Slate, August 8, 2012

Presidents of the Kansas Senate
Republican Party Kansas state senators
Living people
1946 births
People from Garden City, Kansas
Farmers from Kansas
People from Stevens County, Kansas
School board members in Kansas
20th-century American politicians
21st-century American politicians
Kansas State University alumni